The Bătrâna is a right tributary of the Râul Târgului in Romania. Its source is near the Bătrâna Peak, in the Iezer Mountains.

References

Rivers of Romania
Rivers of Argeș County